The 4th Canadian Folk Music Awards were held on November 23, 2008, at the Arts and Cultural Centre in St. John's, Newfoundland and Labrador.

Nominees and recipients
Recipients are listed first and highlighted in boldface.

References

External links
Canadian Folk Music Awards

04
Canadian Folk Music Awards
Canadian Folk Music Awards
Canadian Folk Music Awards
Canadian Folk Music Awards